GROVER or Goddard Remotely Operated Vehicle for Exploration and Research is an Earth-bound autonomous student-designed rover developed by the Goddard Space Flight Center. With this solar-powered rover, scientists hope to get cheaper data about the Greenland ice sheet that lies in a rapidly warming region. The test drive started in Summit Camp in Greenland on a three kilometer thick ice sheet, which is the highest spot on the largest island of the World. The science team is led by the glaciologist Lora Koenig from NASA's Goddard Space Flight Center in Greenbelt, Md.

Scientific expectations and cost reduction
Scientifically, glaciologists expect to get information about how snow accumulates layer by layer over time by using its ground-penetrating radar. Using humans, airplanes or satellites costs more than using rovers. It is expected that the rover will at least meet the performance by humans. Also, the rover should measure newly created layers that occurred in summer 2012, when higher-than-normal temperatures caused surface melting across 97 percent of the ice sheet.

In June, it is planned to send another accompanying rover with the name Cool Robot, which will be able to tow a variety of instruments for glaciological measurements. The solar panels of GROVER are like an A so that it can both get energy from the Sun, which does not set at all in the Arctic summer, and from the reflections. It will use a preprogrammed route and will need only little interactions from the operator.

Technical data

References

Glaciology
NASA programs
Unmanned ground vehicles